East Maitland was an electoral district of the Legislative Assembly in the Australian state of New South Wales from 1859 to 1904 in the Maitland area.

Members for East Maitland

Election results

References

Former electoral districts of New South Wales
1859 establishments in Australia
1904 disestablishments in Australia
Constituencies established in 1859
Constituencies disestablished in 1904